Digital Impact Awards Africa (DIAA) is a platform that promotes Digital inclusion, financial inclusion and Cybersecurity under the theme Maximizing the Digital Dividend. The Awards seek to recognize and appreciate different organizations that are spearheading the use of digital media in this respect.

Digital Impact Awards Africa is organized by HiPipo

Eligibility
To be considered, nominees must have substantially contributed to digital space in Africa. Entries should be offering innovative, useful or engaging digital (web, mobile, social media) content, applications, services or utilities including digital financial services with good cybersecurity practices. Nominees may be of companies (Corporate/SMEs), nonprofit organizations, digital applications, projects, platforms and promotions. The scope of eligible organisations excludes media houses. The project covers 3 main domains: Digital Inclusion, Financial Inclusion and Cybersecurity. The International Telecommunication Union (ITU), the United Nations specialized agency for Information and Communication Technologies- ICTs; listed Digital Impact Awards Africa among the ICT projects and events that celebrated ITU's 150th Anniversary ITU Listing.

Jury and Research Panel voting
Submission for nomination is evaluated and decided by the Research Panel whereas final awards winners are decided by the Jury Panel and Public Vote. The Awards Jury and Research Panel comprise people with extensive knowledge and experience in ICT roles such as entrepreneurs, innovators, academic, consultants, policy makers and thought-leaders.

Award winners
The winners of the 2nd Digital Impact Awards Africa were:
Best Payments/Transfers Service: Payway
Best Online/Mobile Banking Service: Standard Chartered Bank (Uganda)
Best Mobile Money Service: MTN Mobile Money
Best Government Agency on Social Media: National Water and Sewerage Corporation (NWSC)
Best Corporate Brand on Social Media: MTN Uganda
Most Promising Social Media Presence: Crown Beverages Limited (Pepsi, Mirinda, Mountain Dew)
Best E-Commerce (Classifieds / Marketplace): Cheki
Best E-Commerce (Store/Service): HelloFood
Best E-Service: UMEME
Best Mobile App: Kaymu
Best Mobile App for Africa: Vodacom My App (South Africa)
Best Digital Marketing Campaign: Aritel Trace Music Star
Best Digital Customer Service: National Water and Sewerage Corporation (NWSC)
COMMENDED New Website: PostBank Uganda
Best Corporate Website: Standard Chartered Bank (Uganda)
Best Cybersecurity Practice: Standard Chartered Bank (Uganda)
Best Digital Inclusion Impact: Airtel Uganda
COMMENDED Financial Inclusion Impact: Pride MicroFinance Ltd
Best Financial Inclusion Impact: Centenary Bank Uganda
Digital Brand of the Year MTN Uganda

Award Winners 2016 Africa
Medal of Honor
Africa's Financial Inclusion Medal of Honor
	Mr. Michael Joseph
	Dr. Nick Hughes
	Ms. Susie Lonie
Africa's Digital Inclusion Medal of Honor: Mr. Ren Zhengfei	
AWARD of Excellence 
	Digital Brand of the year – MTN
	Best Digital Bank for Africa - Standard Chartered Bank
	Best Mobile Financial Service for Africa - Safaricom/Vodafone M-Pesa
	Best Mobile Financial Service Platform for Africa - Mahindra Comviva Mobiquity
	Best Digital Remittances Service for Africa – Money Gram
	Best Digital Payments Service For Africa – Payway
	Best Cybersecurity Practice by Bank in Africa - First National Bank
	Best Smartphone Brand for Africa – Huawei
	Best Mobile App Innovation for Africa - My Vodacom App
	Best E-Commerce Service for Africa – Jumia
	Best Connectivity Initiative for Africa - Google Project Link (Wi-Fi with Roke Telecom)
	Best Pay TV Service for Africa – DSTV
	Best Digital Marketing Campaign for Africa - Coke Studio Africa
COMMENDATIONS
	Transformative Mobile Banking Platform for Africa - RedCloud One Platform
	Interoperable Digital Payment Enablement for Africa – InterSwitch

Award Winners 2016 Uganda
AWARD of Excellence 
	Best Brand on Social Media - Centenary Bank
	Best Corporate Website - Stanbic Bank – Uganda
	Best Cybersecurity Practice by Corporate - Standard Chartered Bank
	Best Digital Customer Service – NWSC
	Best E-Service - Umeme (E-Pay Yaka and Mobile App)
	Best Financial Inclusion Initiative - Airtel Weza
	Best Government Agency on Social Media – KCCA
	Best Mobile App - MyMTN App
	Best Mobile Banking - Centenary Bank
	Best Mobile Financial Service - MTN Mobile Money
	Best Online Banking - Standard Chartered Bank
	Most Promising Social Media Embrace - Stanbic Bank

Certificate of Commendation;
	Use of Digital for Travel - Modern Coast Express
	Use of Digital for Engineering & Manufacturing - Movit Products Limited
	Use of Digital for Foods & Beverage - Hariss International (Riham, Rockboom)
	Use of Digital for Energy - Total Uganda Limited
	Use of Digital for Agriculture & Agro Processing - Jesa Farm Dairy Limited
	Use of Digital for Insurance – UAP
	Use of Digital for Healthcare - Vine Pharmaceuticals Ltd
	Use of Digital for Real Estate & Construction - National Housing and Construction Company
	Use of Digital for Retail & Distribution - Footsteps Furniture
	Use of Digital for Hospitality - Kampala Serena Hotel
	Use of Digital for Technology - Yo Dime
	Use of Digital for Education – UTAMU
	Use of Digital for Tourism - Great Lakes Safari Limited
	Use of Digital for Finance and Credit - Mercantile Credit Bank
	Cybersecurity Practice by Government Institution – Bank of Uganda
	Championing Digital in Creative Arts Industry – Mr. Moses Ssali

See also
 Africa Digital Awards

References 

African music awards